Fujiwara no Motozane (藤原 元真 1143–1166) was a middle Heian period waka poet and Japanese nobleman. He is designated as a member of the Thirty-six Poetry Immortals.

Motozane's poems are included in several imperial poetry anthologies, including the Shin Kokin Wakashū. A personal poetry collection known as the Motozane-shū also remains.

External links 
E-text of his poems in Japanese

Fujiwara clan
Date of birth unknown
Date of death unknown
12th-century Japanese poets
1143 births